Marko Brkljača (born 15 July 2004) is a Croatian footballer who is playing as a midfielder for  Dinamo Zagreb. He was included in The Guardian's "Next Generation" list for 2021.

Career statistics

Club

Notes

References

2004 births
Living people
Sportspeople from Zadar
Association football midfielders
Croatian footballers
Croatia youth international footballers
HNK Hajduk Split players
Croatian Football League players